The South East Hampshire Bus Rapid Transit (also known as the Eclipse Busway) is a  unguided busway between Gosport and Fareham in the county of Hampshire. The busway scheme is sponsored by Hampshire County Council using the route of the former Fareham to Gosport Line to reduce congestion on the parallel A32 between the towns.

Overview
The busway follows the route of the disused railway from Redlands Lane to Rowner Road. It has 18 stops on the line with three connections in the middle of the line, being Palmerston drive, Wych Lane and Tichborne Way. It runs under four bridges and passes through three towns. The maximum speed on the road is 40 mph (64 km/h) for all vehicles and has a restricted time between 05:45 and 23:15 where outside those times the busway is closed.

History

In 1998 Hampshire County Council and Portsmouth City Council proposed a Light Rail System to link Fareham and Portsmouth via Gosport. Funding of £170m was approved in 2001 but withdrawn in 2004, a decision that was confirmed in 2006. Following this decision, a cheaper, shorter BRT scheme was proposed which led to the creation of the South East Hampshire Bus Rapid Transit.

The route opened on 22 April 2012 with services provided by First Hampshire & Dorset with some of its routes being diverted to use the busway. One of its routes was rebranded to the "Eclipse" bus brand with custom interior specification on its own network of routes that uses the BRT. The "Eclipse" was later given Tap-on Tap-off technology which is compatible with contactless payment card methods.

In 2017, the Hampshire County Council announced plans to extend the busway further south. £1.4m was secured in partnership with Portsmouth City Council in March 2019 and later the same year, planning permission was granted to start work. The proposed extension would continue on from Tichborne way and Hutfield Link to Rowner Road (B3334) in Gosport, following the old disused railway. A ramp would be made to link the busway to the Rowner Road bridge. Several public consultations on the extension were held in Gosport in May 2018 and in July 2019 in different venues.

The route extension was completed by December 2021 and the busway was extended from 2.8 km to 3.4 km with the new exit point being Rowner road. Once the extension is complete, the busway operator would be expected to create a route to Daedalus, Hampshire and renew its fleet with new high specification, low emission buses.

Services
Two existing bus routes were replaced by the new Eclipse Bus Rapid Transit network and one was modified to use part of it. All routes are commercially operated by First Hampshire and Dorset.

Route E1/E2 

Buses on routes 86 and 82 became Eclipse routes E1 and E2 and at peak times route 88 (as the X88 service) was diverted to use part of the busway between Wych Lane and Redlands Lane.

 The E1 starts at Fareham Bus Station and travels westwards to Fareham station before heading south past Fareham College and joins onto the busway at Redlands Lane. It then continues down the busway until Hutfield Link where it continues down Rowner road and goes to Elson, Forton and Newton before meeting up at Alverstoke with the E2 and ends at Gosport Bus Station.
 The E2 continues a similar path with the E1, starting at Fareham Bus Station however it splits at Rowner road, heading to Holbrook to continue down the A32, passing Brockhurst, Camdentown and Privett and meets up with the E1 at Alverstoke where it heads to its terminus at Gosport Bus Station.
Both of these routes run a 10-minute frequency, or a 5-minute frequency combined between peak times. When the busway is closed during morning and evening times, both routes use the A32 instead until Tichborne Way.

Route 9/9A 

On 18 November 2012 service 88 was replaced by the new 9/9A, which was modified to use the busway. This route isn't part of the Eclipse network, hence it doesn't have the custom specification buses put onto the E1/E2 routes.

Both services start at Fareham Bus Station and travels westwards to Fareham station before heading south past Fareham College and joins onto the busway at Redlands Lane. It then continues down the busway until Wych Lane, where it continues down Tukes Avenue going past Bridgemary and Holbrook. The routes split up at Rowner Road with the 9 running along St Nicholas Avenue and Grange Lane and 9A running along Rowner Road and turning into Grange Road. Both routes meet up at Howe Road where they serve the areas of Browndown, Privett and Alverstoke before terminating at Gosport Bus Station.

Both of these routes run a 40-minute frequency, or a 20-minute frequency combined between peak times. When the busway is closed during morning and evening times, both routes use the A32 instead until Wych Lane.

Gallery

References

Guided busways and BRT systems in the United Kingdom